Telarah is a suburb in the City of Maitland, New South Wales, Australia. The suburb was formerly known as Homeville, however use of this name was abandoned in the 1950s. It is located on the New England Highway and is also the site of a major rail junction, where the North Coast line and the once extensive, privately owned South Maitland Railway system meet the Main North line. A station on the North Coast line opened in 1911 and is served by NSW TrainLink's Hunter Line, with services to Newcastle and Dungog. Telarah has its own fire brigade as well as bowling club, supermarket, pharmacy, takeaway shop and petrol station.

History 
The traditional owners and custodians of the Maitland area are the Wonnarua people.

Heritage listings
Telarah has a number of heritage-listed sites, including:
 Junction Street: South Maitland Railway Workshops

References

External links

Suburbs of Maitland, New South Wales